The Napa River flood of 1986 is considered by many to be the worst flood experienced by Napa, California during the 20th century. With 20 inches of rain that fell in a 48 hour period; 7,000 people were evacuated, 250 homes were destroyed and another 2,500 damaged, 3 people died and totaled an estimated $100 million in overall damage. 
  
  
Following the flood, residents expressed a renewed urgency to mitigate flooding caused by winter storms and man made created obstacles that slowed the flow of the river on its course to the San Francisco Bay.  Since the flood, the Napa County Flood Control and Water Conservation District has been working on controlling the floods by way of the Napa River Flood Project.  Another flood of lesser proportions occurred on December 31, 2005, after over a week of rain. Other smaller floods occurred in 1995 and 1997.

References

External links
The Napa County Flood Control Official Site

1986
1986 in California
1986 floods in the United States